Magnus Lund (born 25 June 1983 in Manchester) is a retired English Rugby Union player.

He was educated at the Lancaster Royal Grammar School where he played for the first XV. He also studied Business Enterprise at the Manchester Metropolitan University. During his youth he represented England in both the under-16 and under-18 national sides.

Lund made his debut for the Sale Sharks in 2002 against the Bristol Shoguns. In 2002 he represented England at the under-19 World Cup in Italy. The following year he represented the under-21 team at the World Cup in South Africa. He then became a member of the England sevens side. In the 2005–06 season, Lund started the final and scored a try as Sale Sharks won their first ever Premiership title.

He was part of the 2006 Six Nations Championship Training squad, and was chosen in the 2006–07 Elite squad after a successful tour to Australia in the summer. Lund was chosen for England in the 2007 Six Nations Championship opener against Scotland, in which he scored a try as England won 42–20.

 He was called up to the England squad for the 2008 Six Nations Championship.

Lund moved to Biarritz Olympique Pays Basque in June 2008 and spent six years playing for the French Top 14 club.  He was a member of Biarritz when it finished runner-up to Toulouse in the 2010 Heineken Cup, and played with his brother Erik Lund there when the elder Lund joined the club in 2010. In July 2014 Lund returned to the Sharks.

Family
Lund's father, Morten Lund, was an international basketball player for Norway, and stayed in England after studying in Manchester. He now lives back in Oslo, where Magnus tries to visit twice a year. Lund's elder brother, Erik, is the captain of the Norwegian national rugby union team and plays for the French Top 14 club Biarritz Olympique.

References

External links
 Profile at Sale Sharks
 
 

1983 births
Living people
Alumni of Manchester Metropolitan University
Biarritz Olympique players
Commonwealth Games medallists in rugby sevens
Commonwealth Games rugby sevens players of England
Commonwealth Games silver medallists for England
England international rugby sevens players
England international rugby union players
English expatriate rugby union players
English expatriate sportspeople in France
English people of Norwegian descent
English rugby union players
Expatriate rugby union players in France
Male rugby sevens players
People educated at Lancaster Royal Grammar School
Rugby sevens players at the 2006 Commonwealth Games
Rugby union flankers
Rugby union players from Manchester
Sale Sharks players
Medallists at the 2006 Commonwealth Games